"I Just Wanna Be Mad" is a song written by Kelley Lovelace and Lee Thomas Miller, and recorded by Canadian country music artist Terri Clark.  It was released in August 2002 as the first single released from Clark's album Pain to Kill.  It peaked at number 2 on Billboard's Hot Country Songs chart, becoming Clark's first top 10 single on that chart since "You're Easy on the Eyes" in 1998, and reached number 27 on the Billboard Hot 100. Clark's performance of the song was nominated for a 2003 Juno Award for Country Recording of the Year.

The song was originally to be recorded by John Michael Montgomery.

Content
The song is an impassioned lyric about sticking it out in a relationship.

Critical reception
Deborah Evans Price, of Billboard magazine reviewed the song favorably, calling it an "uptempo, easy-to-sing-along-with, radio-friendly ode to the complexities of modern relationships, and Clark gives it all she's got." She goes on to say that the writers, Lovelace and Miller, have "crafted a lyric that examines the dynamics of relationships."

Music video
A music video was released for the song, directed by Deaton-Flanigen Productions. It shows Clark wearing a red sweater performing the song with a guitar under many strobe lights in downtown Nashville, as well as scenes of her and her boyfriend (who works as a hotel valet) fighting for an unknown reason. She gets in her convertible and leaves him, leaving him to become anxious and upset as to what he did to make her upset. He impatiently waits for her to come back, and in the last seconds of the video she does. He gets in the passengers side, much to her dismay, and the two ride off together. Scenes featuring her driving her car through Nashville are also shown.

Chart performance
"I Just Wanna Be Mad" debuted at number 51 on the U.S. Billboard Hot Country Singles & Tracks for the week of August 31, 2002.

Year-end charts

References

2002 singles
2002 songs
Terri Clark songs
Songs written by Lee Thomas Miller
Song recordings produced by Keith Stegall
Songs written by Kelley Lovelace
Song recordings produced by Byron Gallimore
Mercury Records singles
Music videos directed by Deaton-Flanigen Productions
Canadian Country Music Association Single of the Year singles